Robert Walter Moevs (2 December 1920 – 10 December 2007) was an American composer of contemporary classical music. He was known for his highly chromatic music.

Career
Moevs was born in La Crosse, Wisconsin, and served in the United States Army Air Forces as a pilot during World War II. He then received his degree from Harvard University. Moevs was a student of Walter Piston and Nadia Boulanger. He taught at Harvard University and Rutgers University. He received the Rome Prize (1952) and a Guggenheim Fellowship (1962). In 1978 his Concerto Grosso was awarded the Stockhausen International Prize in Composition.

His music has been performed by the Cleveland Orchestra, the Boston Symphony Orchestra and the Symphony of the Air. His papers, including unpublished scores and recordings, are held by the Rutgers Music Library. He died in Hillsborough, New Jersey.

Music

Discography

Notes

Sources
Archibald, Bruce, and Richard Wilson. 2008. "Moevs, Robert (Walter)". Grove Music Online, edited by Dean Roote (accessed 1 October 2013).

Further reading
Boros, James. 1990. "The Systematic Chromaticism of Robert Moevs." Perspectives of New Music 28/1 (Winter): 294–323.
Boros, James. 1990. "A Conversation with Robert Moevs." Perspectives of New Music 28/1 (Winter): 324–335.
Boros, James. 1990. "The Evolution of Robert Moevs's Compositional Methodology." American Music 8/4 (Winter): 383–404.
Moevs, Robert. 1966. "Some Observations on Instruction in Music Theory." College Music Symposium 6 (Fall): 69–71.
Moevs, Robert. 1969. "Music and the Liturgy." Liturgical Arts 38/1 (November): 4–9.
Moevs, Robert. 1969. "Intervallic Procedures in Debussy." Perspectives of New Music 8/1 (Fall/Winter): 82–101.
Moevs, Robert. 1971. "Mannerism and Stylistic Consistency in Stravinsky." Perspectives of New Music 9/2 (10/1): 92–103.
Moevs, Robert, in conversation with Ellen Rosand. 1980. "Recollections—Nadia Boulanger (1887–1979)." 19th-Century Music 3/3 (March): 276–278.
Wilkinson, Carlton. 1997. "Robert Moevs's Heptachronon for solo cello." Perspectives of New Music 35/1 (Winter): 231–261.

External links
Robert Moevs, Theodore Presser Company
Robert Moevs, bach-cantatas.com
"A tribute to Moevs"by Richard Wilson, newmusicbox.org 
Recordings of some works by Robert Moevs, YouTube
Interview with Robert Moevs by Bruce Duffie, December 28, 1988

American male classical composers
American classical composers
20th-century classical composers
1920 births
2007 deaths
People from La Crosse, Wisconsin
Military personnel from Wisconsin
United States Army Air Forces pilots of World War II
Harvard University alumni
Harvard University faculty
Rutgers University faculty
Pupils of Walter Piston
20th-century American composers
Classical musicians from Wisconsin
20th-century American male musicians